The Hamilton Township School District is a comprehensive community public school district, serving students in pre-kindergarten through twelfth grade from Hamilton Township, in Mercer County, New Jersey, United States. The district is one of the state's ten largest and  consists of 17 elementary schools, three middle schools and three high schools along with an alternative program.

As of the 2021–22 school year, the district, comprised of 23 schools, had an enrollment of 11,816 students and 969.4 classroom teachers (on an FTE basis), for a student–teacher ratio of 12.2:1.

The district is classified by the New Jersey Department of Education as being in District Factor Group "FG", the fourth-highest of eight groupings. District Factor Groups organize districts statewide to allow comparison by common socioeconomic characteristics of the local districts. From lowest socioeconomic status to highest, the categories are A, B, CD, DE, FG, GH, I and J.

Schools
Schools in the district (with 2021–22 enrollment data from the National Center for Education Statistics) are:

Elementary schools
Alexander Elementary School (with 351 students; in grades K-5)
Joe Bookholdt, Principal
Greenwood Elementary School (236; K-5)
Dr. Nicole Dickens-Simon, Principal
Kisthardt Elementary School (231; K-5)
Donna Glomb, Principal
Klockner Elementary School (234; PreK-5)
Rashaan Monroe, Principal
Kuser Elementary School (398; PreK-5)
Roberto Kesting, Principal
Lalor Elementary School (317; K-5)
Jennifer Marinello, Principal
Langtree Elementary School (393; PreK-5)
Joyce Gallo, Principal
McGalliard Elementary School (250; K-5)
Barbara Morales, Principal
Mercerville Elementary School (328; K-5)
John Byrne, Principal
Morgan Elementary School (276; K-5)
Michael Giambelluca, Principal
Robinson Elementary School (401; K-5)
Katie Mallon, Principal
Sayen Elementary School (260; K-5)
Diana Vasil, Principal
Sunnybrae Elementary School (275; K-5)
Max Achtau, Principal
University Heights Elementary School (336; PreK-5)
Sue Diszler, Principal
George E. Wilson Elementary School (418; PreK-5)
Dereth Sanchez-Ahmed, Principal
Yardville Elementary School (302; PreK-5)
Richard Czyz, Principal
Yardville Heights Elementary School (261; K-5)
James Sterenczak, Principal
Middle schools
Richard C. Crockett Middle School (999; 6-8)
Dr. Roxann Clark-Holmes, Principal
Albert E. Grice Middle School (941; 6-8)
David Innocenzi, Principal
Emily C. Reynolds Middle School (914; 6-8)
Patricia Landolfi-Collins, Principal
High schools
Nottingham High School (North) (985; 9-12)
Frank Ragazzo, Principal
Hamilton High School West (1,447; 9-12)
Brian Smith, Principal
Steinert High School (East) (1,280; 9-12)
Bridget O'Neill, Principal
Other schools
Hamilton Educational Program (HEP) High School
Cathy Nolan, Principal

Administration
Core members of the district's administration are:
Dr. Scott R. Rocco, Superintendent
Katherine Attwood, Business Administrator / Board Secretary

Board of education
The district's board of education, comprised of nine members, sets policy and oversees the fiscal and educational operation of the district through its administration. As a Type II school district, the board's trustees are elected directly by voters to serve three-year terms of office on a staggered basis, with three seats up for election each year held (since 2012) as part of the November general election. The board appoints a superintendent to oversee the district's day-to-day operations and a business administrator to supervise the business functions of the district.

References

External links

 
School Data for the Hamilton Township Public Schools, National Center for Education Statistics

Hamilton Township, Mercer County, New Jersey
New Jersey District Factor Group FG
School districts in Mercer County, New Jersey